Reed-leaf wattle is a common name for several plants and may refer to:

Acacia calamifolia
Acacia euthycarpa, endemic to southern Australia